Neale Sheila Godfrey (born March 4, 1951) is an American author. Her books deal with money, life skills, and value issues. One of them, Money Doesn't Grow on Trees: A Parent's Guide to Raising Financially Responsible Children, was a New York Times #1 Best Seller. She is currently Executive in Residence at the Columbia Graduate School of Business and is a former contributor at Forbes.com.

Early life and education 
Neale grew up in West Caldwell, New Jersey and graduated from James Caldwell High School in 1969.<ref>"Author Neale Godfrey makes James Caldwell High proud", New Jersey Hills, September 23, 2004. Accessed March 28, 2019. "'My parents lived on Forest Avenue in West Caldwell and I attended Lincoln School, Grover Cleveland Junior High and James Caldwell High School. Drama was my passion,' Godfrey said of her high school years."</ref> She then obtained a B.S., cum laude, from The School of International Service at the American University.

 Career 
Neale began her career with Chase Manhattan Bank in 1972, joining as one of the first female executives and later became president of The First Women's Bank and founder of The First Children's Bank in F.A.O. Schwarz. In 1989, Neale formed her own company, Children's Financial Network, Inc., with a mission to educate children and their parents about money.

Over the years, Neale has served as a national spokesperson for such companies as Aetna, Microsoft, Coca-Cola, Fidelity, Nuveen. She has also appeared as a financial expert on programs such as The Oprah Winfrey Show, Good Morning America, The Today Show, and CNN, as well as in the PBS special, Your Money, Your Children, Your Life. Neale is also a former nationally syndicated columnist for the Associated Press.

Neale has served on the White House and governor's Task Forces as well as on the board of directors of New York Board of Trade, UNICEF, University of Charleston, Morris County Chamber of Commerce, UN Women, and the Young Presidents’ Organization (YPO).

 Books and programs 
Neale's most widely read books are "Money Doesn't Grow on Trees: A Parent's Guide to Raising Financially Responsible Children," that reached #1 on the New York Times Best Sellers list, and "Neale S. Godfrey's Ultimate Kids' Money Book." Other notable titles include Mom, Inc.: Taking Your Work Skills Home, A Penny Saved: Teaching Your Children the Values and Life Skills They Will Need to Live in the Real World, and Money Still Doesn't Grow on Trees: A Parent's Guide to Raising Financially Responsible Teenagers and Young Adults.  

Through Neale's guidance, Children's Financial Network produced a national program starting in 2007 entitled LIFE, Inc: The Ultimate Career Guide for Young People. This program, which ran through 2012, served over one million middle school and high school students. The LIFE, Inc. video and program received the Mercury Communications Award. One of her books, ECO-Effect: The Greening of Money, combines economics and ecology to show adults and children how they can save money while saving the environment.

Neale was one of the first to develop money curricula for children and young adults, pre-K through high school, entitled The One and Only Common Sense/Cents Series as well as a CD ROM called MoneyTown. The curriculum was implemented in over 5,000 classrooms across 48 states. She has also released three iOS video gaming apps, two hitting #1 in the Educational Gaming Category: GreenStreets: Unleash The Loot! and GreenStreets: Shmootz Happens! Her latest app, GreenStreets: Heifer International, is a collaboration with Heifer International that teaches kids and parents how to connect the virtual and real worlds.

Currently, Neale serves on New Jersey's State Employment and Training Commission Council on Gender Parity in Labor and Education as well as New Jersey's Science and Technology Workforce Subcommittee. She serves on the board of advisors of DriveWealth, a mobile and global full carrying broker dealer for retail investors, providing a low-cost, easy-to-use investing platform to individuals worldwide. Neale is also a faculty member of the Entrepreneurship Bootcamp for Veterans with Disabilities (EBV), and VWise (Veteran Women Igniting the Spirit of Entrepreneurship), operated by the Institute For Veterans and Military Families at the Whitman School of Management of Syracuse University, which offers training to post-9/11 disabled veterans.

Awards
In 2009, Neale was recognized as one of New Jersey's “50 Best Women in Business,” and that same year, she was National Winner of w2wlink's Ascendancy Awards for Business Women. Neale has also been honored with awards such as “Woman of the Year,” “Banker of the Year,” “Child Advocate of the Year,” and the Femme Award from the United Nations. In 2011, she was awarded Garden State Woman of the Year. She was the recipient of United Negro College Fund’s Outstanding Community Service Award in 2012 and received the 2013 Women of Influence Award from the Commerce and Industry Association of New Jersey. Also in 2013, Neale graduated from The National Security Seminar at the U.S. Army War College. More recently, Neale earned the Muriel Siebert Lifetime Achievement Award for her trailblazing work on financial literacy and achieved the National Honoree designation from WomenInBusiness.org.

 Selected bibliography 

 Godfrey, Neale, Edwards, Carolina, Richards, Tad (1989). Money Doesn't Grow on Trees: A Parent's Guide to Raising Financially Responsible Children. Atria Books. 
 Godfrey, Neale, Richards, Tad (1995). Penny Saved: Teaching Your Children the Values and Life Skills They Will Need to Live in the Real World. Simon & Schuster. 
 Godfrey, Neale, Richards, Tad (1997). Making Change: A Woman's Guide to Designing Her Financial Future. Simon & Schuster. 
 Godfrey, Neale, Randy Verougstraete (1998). Neale S. Godfrey's Ultimate Kids' Money Book. Simon & Schuster Children's Publishing. 
 Godfrey, Neale S., Richards, Tad (2000). Mom, Inc.: Taking Your Work Skills Home. Fireside. 
 Godfrey, Neale, Richards, Tad (2004). Money Still Doesn't Grow on Trees: A Parent's Guide to Raising Financially Responsible Teenagers and Young Adults. Rodale Books. 
 Godfrey, Neale S. (2009). Eco Effect - The Greening of Money. Children's Financial Network''.

References

External links
 Neale Godfrey - Money for Life
 Children's Financial Network
 Moolah-la
 Life INC.
 Moms on the Move

1951 births
American women writers
James Caldwell High School alumni
Living people
People from West Caldwell, New Jersey
Writers from New Jersey
American finance and investment writers
American financial businesspeople
American University alumni
Businesspeople from New Jersey
21st-century American women